The 2018–19 Santa Clara Broncos men's basketball team represents Santa Clara University during the 2018–19 NCAA Division I men's basketball season. The Broncos are led by third-year head coach Herb Sendek and play their home games at the Leavey Center as members of the West Coast Conference.

Previous season
The Broncos finished the 2017–18 season 11–20, 8–10 in WCC play to finish in seventh place. They lost in the first round of the WCC tournament to Pepperdine.

Departures

Incoming Transfers

Recruiting

Recruiting class of 2019

Roster

Schedule and results

|-
!colspan=9 style=| Non-conference regular season

|-
!colspan=9 style=| WCC regular season

|-
!colspan=9 style=| WCC tournament

References

Santa Clara Broncos men's basketball seasons
Santa Clara
Santa Clara
Santa Clara